Ahmed Mostafa Mohamed Sayed commonly known as Zizo , (10 January 1996), is an Egyptian professional footballer who plays as a winger for Egyptian Premier League club Zamalek and the Egypt national team.

Career

Club
Zizo made his Belgian Pro League debut at 29 March 2014 against Waasland-Beveren in a 0–2 away win in the 2013–14 season, he replaced Souleymane Diomandé after 50 minutes. He went onto make 72 appearances and score 49 goals in his first four seasons between 2014 and 2017 with Lierse. In January 2017, Sayed joined Primeira Liga side Nacional on loan, with an option to buy, for the rest of the 2016–17 season.

Career statistics

International

Honours and achievements
Zamalek
Egyptian Premier League: 2020–21, 2021–22
Egypt Cup: 2018–19,  2020–21 
Egyptian Super Cup: 2019–20
CAF Confederation Cup: 2018–19
CAF Super Cup: 2020

Performances 
 Egyptian Premier League top goalscorer: 2021–22

References

External links

 

1996 births
Living people
Egyptian footballers
Egyptian expatriate footballers
Expatriate footballers in Belgium
Expatriate footballers in Portugal
Egyptian expatriate sportspeople in Belgium
Egyptian expatriate sportspeople in Portugal
Lierse S.K. players
C.D. Nacional players
Moreirense F.C. players
Belgian Pro League players
Challenger Pro League players
Primeira Liga players
Footballers from Cairo
Association football midfielders
2021 Africa Cup of Nations players